Roger Federer was the defending champion, but did not complete in the Juniors this year.

Jürgen Melzer defeated Kristian Pless in the final, 7–6(9–7), 6–3 to win the boys' singles tennis title at the 1999 Wimbledon Championships.

Seeds

  Kristian Pless (final)
  David Nalbandian (semifinals, withdrew)
  Guillermo Coria (semifinals)
  Éric Prodon (first round)
  José de Armas (quarterfinals)
  Jarkko Nieminen (first round)
  Thiago Alves (first round)
  Lovro Zovko (quarterfinals)
  Joachim Johansson (second round)
  Mardy Fish (third round, retired)
  Andy Roddick (second round)
  Ladislav Chramosta (first round)
  Jean-Julien Rojer (first round)
  Julien Benneteau (first round)
 n/a
  Cristian Villagrán (first round)

Draw

Finals

Top half

Section 1

Section 2

Bottom half

Section 3

Section 4

References

External links

Boys' Singles
Wimbledon Championship by year – Boys' singles